Mohammed Al-Moqahwi (born 11 February 1995) is a Saudi professional footballer who plays as a goalkeeper for Pro League club Al-Adalah.

Career
Al-Moqahwi started his career with Al-Adalah where he was promoted from the youth team to the first team, On 2015. Al-Moqahwi helped Al-Adalah reach the Pro League, the top tier of Saudi football, for the first time in the club's history.

References

External links 
 

1995 births
Living people
Saudi Arabian footballers
Al-Adalah FC players
Association football goalkeepers
Saudi First Division League players
Saudi Second Division players
Saudi Professional League players
Saudi Arabian Shia Muslims